Gerard Pierre Laurent Kalshoven Gude (1858 Amsterdam – 8 November 1924) was a malacologist from the United Kingdom.

He joined the Conchological Society of Great Britain in 1890. He was elected as a fellow of the Zoological Society of London in 1884.

Bibliography 
He published malacological works since 1893.

Among his works belongs two volumes of The Fauna of British India, Including Ceylon and Burma.

  Gude G. K. (1896). Armature of helicoid landshells. Science-Gossip Science-Gossip 29(23): 88-92, 126-128, 154-156, 178-181, 204-207, 244-246, 274-276, 300-302, 10-11, 36-37, 70-71, 102-103, 138-139, 170-171, 231-232, 263-264, 284-285, 15-17, 74-76, 114-115, 133-134, 170-172, 239-240, 332-333, 15-17, 75-77, 147-149, 174-177. - description of Plectopylis - type genus of Plectopylidae
  Gude G. K. (1900). "Further notes on helicoid land shells from Japan, the Loo-Choo, and Bonin Islands, with descriptions of seven new species". Proceedings of the Malacological Society of London 4: 70-80.
 Gude G. K. (1914). [https://archive.org/details/molluscaiitrocho00gude Mollusca.−II. (Trochomorphidae--Janellidae)''''].The Fauna of British India, Including Ceylon and Burma, London, xii + 520 pp., 164 figs. Edited by Arthur Everett Shipley (1861–1927) and Guy Anstruther Knox Marshall (1871–1959).
 Gude G. K. (1921). Mollusca.−III. Land operculates (Cyclophoridae, Truncatellidae, Assimineidae, Helicinidae).The Fauna of British India, Including Ceylon and Burma, London, 386 pp. Edited by Arthur Everett Shipley (1861–1927) and Guy Anstruther Knox Marshall (1871–1959).

Eponymous taxa
Taxa named in honour of G. K. Gude include:
 Gudeodiscus'' Páll-Gergely, 2013

References 

British malacologists
1858 births
1924 deaths
Fellows of the Zoological Society of London